Capmany or Campmany is a village and municipality in the comarca of Alt Empordà, Girona, Catalonia, Spain.

The earliest recorded name for the village is Campmany, derived from the Latin Campus Magnus meaning "big field", but this became corrupted into Capmany ("big head") which is now the official name of the village, though the name Campmany is also commonly used.

References

External links
 
 Government data pages 

Municipalities in Alt Empordà